Kerala Vidyalayam Higher Secondary School is located at Dasaprakash, Chennai, India. Most of the Malayalam  children study there. The school was organized by the Madras Kerala Samaj.

In 1966 Madras Kerala Samaj, in its pursuit of serving society through education, started the school, where education was offered to the Malayalees community at affordable cost. The school has a student strength of around 800. And now Tamil students are also welcomes to join in this school. These school offers 3 languages 1tamil, 2 Malayalam, 3 English .

High schools and secondary schools in Chennai
Educational institutions established in 1966
1966 establishments in Madras State